Little Elk Creek is a river in Otsego County, New York. It converges with Elk Creek south-southwest of Westford.

References

Rivers of New York (state)
Rivers of Otsego County, New York